Spider-Man Unlimited is an American animated series by Saban Entertainment which features the Marvel comic book superhero Spider-Man, intended as a loose sequel series to the previous Spider-Man: The Animated Series, which ran from 1994 to 1998. Unlimited premiered in 1999, and though it had fair ratings, it was overshadowed by Pokémon and the newly debuted Digimon, and canceled after airing only a few episodes. Fox Kids later resumed airing the show from 1999 to 2001, airing 13 episodes, the last ending on a cliffhanger.

The specific incarnation of Spider-Man who serves as the focus of Spider-Man Unlimited will return in the 2023 feature film Spider-Man: Across the Spider-Verse, depicted as a member of Miguel O'Hara's Spider-Forces.

Production 
Initially, the goal was to do a low-budget adaptation of the first 26 issues of The Amazing Spider-Man comic book, but Sony and Marvel had already engaged in a deal to produce the Spider-Man movie, and so Saban was cut from any source and could not use the traditional Spider-Man suit or adapt the early comics. Also, in the original idea, Spider-Man was stranded in a Counter-Earth in which Ben Parker did not die and thus Peter Parker lacked the moral fortitude to resist becoming Venom. However, Marvel Comics did not like the idea and stated that they would not do a story with two Peter Parkers.Also this show was made after Marvel decided not to move ahead with a show focusing on Spider-Man 2099 following consideration due to the DC Comics show set in the DC Animated Universe, Batman Beyond premiering earlier that year which covered the futuristic setting.  

Unlike the previous series which used digital ink and paint, the animation on the series was made using traditional cels.

Several scripts were written for Season 2, including the conclusion of the cliffhanger, but were never produced.

Plot 
While covering the launch of John Jameson's one-man mission to Counter-Earth (another Earth located on the far side of the Sun), Spider-Man attempts to stop his two symbiote adversaries Venom and Carnage from boarding the shuttlecraft. Blamed for losing contact with Jameson by J. Jonah Jameson of the Daily Bugle, Spider-Man becomes a target of persecution by the media and the public at large, with a bounty placed on his head. After John Jameson had made contact with Earth through a distress signal, Spider-Man borrows nanotechnology from Reed Richards to design a new suit that incorporates built in webshooters, stealth technology and anti-symbiote sonic weaponry. Making his way to Counter-Earth after persuading an attacking Nick Fury to let him rescue Jameson, Spider-Man learns that Jameson has fallen in with a band of freedom fighters opposed to the High Evolutionary whose Beastials, hybrids of animal and humanoid attributes, are the dominant species whilst humans are the second-class minority.

With Jameson reluctant to return until all of the Beastials are defeated, Spider-Man elects to remain on Counter-Earth, blending in as best as he can as Peter Parker, taking up residence in the apartment of a doctor, Naoko Yamada-Jones and her son Shane and fighting the High Evolutionary, his Knights of Wundagore, and his Machine Men alongside the rebels as Spider-Man. It is soon discovered that Venom and Carnage are also on Counter-Earth, and are following orders from the Synoptic, a hive-minded legion of Counter-Earth symbiotes.

This series also shows the animated version of John Jameson's Man-Wolf form, superhero versions of mainstream villains Green Goblin and Vulture, and Counter-Earth's counterparts of Kraven the Hunter and Electro.

Characters

Heroes 
 Peter Parker / Spider-Man (voiced by Rino Romano) – A photographer for the Daily Bugle newspaper who was bitten by a radioactive spider and received spider-like abilities, becoming the superhero known as Spider-Man. The series begins with Spider-Man attempting to stop Venom and Carnage from escaping in a rocket piloted by John Jameson. Failing to stop them, Venom and Carnage took the ship Counter-Earth, with Jameson hostage. Peter borrowed nanotechnology from Reed Richards to design a new suit to counter the symbiotes' powers. He travels to Counter-Earth where he learns that Jameson has fallen in with a band of freedom fighters opposed to the High Evolutionary whose Beastials, hybrids of animal and humanoid attributes, are the dominant species whilst humans are the second-class minority.
 Dr. Naoko Yamada-Jones (voiced by Akiko Morison) – A doctor on Counter-Earth. After Peter rescues her son Shane from a Machine Man, she gave Peter an offer to live in her house rent-free for two weeks, which he accepts. She is married to Hector Jones, her long lost husband. She has a dislike for Spider-Man despite his heroics as she is unaware that Spider-Man is actually Peter Parker.
 Shane Yamada-Jones (voiced by Rhys Huber) – The 10-year-old only son of Dr. Naoko Yamada and Hector Jones. He looks up to Peter and hates when Peter and Naoko fight as it reminds him of his parents fighting and eventual split. He, like his mother, doesn't know of Peter's Spider-Man secret.
 John Jameson / Man-Wolf (voiced by John Payne II as John Jameson, Scott McNeil as Man-Wolf) – The leader of a team of rebels who fight against the High Evolutionary. He crashed on Counter-Earth due to interference from Venom and Carnage, who had stowed aboard his ship. He and Spider-Man joined the human rebels to fight the High Evolutionary and his Beastials and restore peace to Counter-Earth. Later on as seen in the episode "Ill Met by Moonlight," the High Evolutionary had experimented on Jameson and every time he gets angry he becomes the Man-Wolf, marking Man-Wolf's first animated appearance. Unlike his other versions, in which the transformation is caused by a gemstone, this version of his Man-Wolf form is caused by being experimented by the High Evolutionary.
 Counter-Earth Rebellion - A group of humans that lead a rebellion against the High Evolutionary's forces.
 Karen O'Malley (voiced by Kim Hawthorne) – The second-in-command of the Rebellion and John Jameson's love interest. In "Sins of the Father," it is revealed that she is the granddaughter of the High Evolutionary. He made some experiments on her when she was still in her mother's womb, thus giving her abnormal strength and agility. Karen share resemblance with Mary-Jane Watson in appearance.
 Daniel Bromely (voiced by Christopher Gaze) - Another member of the Rebellion, he came to New York City with his family before the High Evolutionary takes over Counter-Earth and he is one of the few humans that lived a normal life before the Beastials were created. His family was taken to Castle Wundagore by the High Evolutionary and they were never seen again. Bromely was angered with the High Evolutionary that destroyed his life and family and decided to join the Human Rebels. He worked with John Jameson in the Human Rebels and met Spider-Man when he was sent to rescue him from the Knights of Wundagore that tried to reveal his true race.
 Git Hoskins – Git is a member of the rebels who doesn't speak. Sir Ram made an experiment on Git when he was young, resulting in him having mummy-like bandages and giving him the powers to stretch and control his bandages. Due to his appearance, he didn't have any friends growing up. Because of this, he has a personal grudge against Sir Ram.
 X-51 (voiced by Dale Wilson) – X-51 was an obsolete Machine Man who crashed and unexpectedly gained sentience. As the result, the android becomes benevolent and protects humans from the High Evolutionary. He saved Shane from a giant rhino. The High Evolutionary wanted to conduct experiments on X-51 to learn his developments. He was kidnapped by the High Evolutionary, but was saved by Spider-Man, Karen and John. Sir Ram later implanted a chip for a trap against the rebels but Spider-Man destroys it. After defeating Sir Ram, X-51 joins the rebels for both humanity and machines' freedom.

Villains 
 High Evolutionary (voiced by Richard Newman) - The main antagonist of the series, the High Evolutionary, disgusted with the behavior of human on Earth, believed that a greater genetic diversity heightens survival traits. He left Earth to travel to Counter-Earth to begin anew, but found the same destructive tendencies that Human's had plagued his Earth. The High Evolutionary then proceeded to create a new society, with his human/animal creatures loyal only to him called Beastials (Half-humans, Half-animals). The High Evolutionary also created an elite squad of Beastials called the Knights of Wundagore, who also use the Machine Men as law enforcers to keep the humans in order. The New York City on Counter-Earth is divided vertically with humans living on the bottom and the Beastials living miles above the street, ruling with an iron fist. The High Evolutionary's plan was simple, to turn this planet into an earthly paradise, no matter what it takes, that is until Spider-Man and the Symbiotes led by Venom and Carnage arrived. In the second to last episode of the series, it was revealed to the High Evolutionary that he is the grandfather of Karen O'Malley and that he experimented on her when she was young. The High Evolutionary was injured during the series finale in a fight against Spider-Man, Green Goblin, and The Rebellion, led by Karen and John Jameson.
 Knights of Wundagore - A group of elite Beastials who serve the High Evolutionary.
 Lord Tyger (voiced by David Sobolov) – Lord Tyger is a genetically evolved tiger and one of the High Evolutionary's first New Men. He was later placed as the leader of the Knights of Wundagore.
 Sir Ram (voiced by Ron Halder) - One of the High Evolutionary's Knights of Wundagore and a genetically evolved bighorn sheep. He has done various experiments and was responsible for Git's current appearance as well as creating Firedrake.
 Lady Ursula (voiced by Tasha Simms) - One of the High Evolutionary's Knights of Wundagore and a genetically evolved bear.
 Lady Vermin (voiced by Jennifer Hale) - One of the High Evolutionary's Knights of Wundagore and a genetically evolved rat. When Spider-Man came to Counter-Earth, she was immediately attracted to him. She usually was trying to seduce Spider-Man. When Lady Vermin caught Spider-Man inside Wundagore Castle, he tricked her into thinking he wanted to see her, much to her happiness. Later, Spider-Man states that she was "Getting Ready" when he knocked her out.
 Machine Men (voiced by Dale Wilson) - The Machine Men are robots that serve as the law enforces of the High Evolutionary and often back up the Knights of Wundagore.
 Eddie Brock / Venom (voiced by Brian Drummond) - One of the series' main antagonists, by this time, the Venom Symbiote has merged completely with him and he attempts to conquer Counter-Earth alongside Carnage with an invasion of Symbiotes. Eddie himself is briefly separated from Venom in the episode "One is the Loneliest Number" when the Beastials wanted to experiment on it.
 Cletus Kasady / Carnage (voiced by Michael Donovan) - One of the series' main antagonists. The symbiote is in complete control of Kasady and works well with Venom. They traveled to Counter-Earth to join the Symnoptic, a similar hive mind of symbiotes.
 The Hunter (voiced by Paul Dobson) - The Counter-Earth version of Kraven the Hunter who is bald-headed with a ponytail and is always barefoot. He is one of a few humans that the High Evolutionary allows to live in the upper parts of the city. He works as a mercenary for both the rebels and the High Evolutionary. The Hunter is hired by the High Evolutionary to hunt and kill and/or capture Spider-Man. Upon breaking into his lair, Spider-Man discovered that the Hunter was using a toxic formula that when mixed with certain animal pheromones gives traits of that animal to the drinker, but also poisons bone marrow, damages the liver, and cuts your lifespan in half. The Hunter stated it's a necessary sacrifice for the power it brings. Spider-Man defeats him by trouncing him and turning his security system against him stating that he now knows the Hunter's secret. Spider-Man warns the Hunter that if he comes after the Rebels or him again, he will use this knowledge to beat him into the ground.
 Electro (voiced by Dale Wilson) - The Counter-Earth version of Electro, he's a Beastial electric eel that possesses electrical powers. In "Ill Met By Moonlight," Electro is a guard for the High Evolutionary's main base Wundagore Castle. During the fight, Spider-Man continues to make references about the original Electro.

Others 
 J. Jonah Jameson (voiced by Richard Newman) – The father of John Jameson who runs the Daily Bugle. He only appears in "World's Apart" Pt. 1 where he blames Spider-Man for what happened with his son's shuttle.
 Mary Jane Watson-Parker (voiced by Jennifer Hale) – At some point, Mary Jane Watson married Peter, and Peter revealed his secret identity as Spider-Man to her. They continued to be a happily married couple and Mary Jane was constantly worried about Peter's life as Spider-Man. When Peter chased Venom and Carnage to Counter-Earth, MJ remained behind on Earth and waited for him.
 Nick Fury (voiced by Mark Gibbon) – Only appears in "Worlds Apart" Pt. 1. When Spider-Man attempted to steal a shuttle to hitch a ride to Counter-Earth, Fury attempted to stop him before he realized that Spider-Man was right, and allowed him to carry on with his mission.
 Green Goblin/Hector Jones (voiced by Rino Romano) – He is the Counter-Earth Green Goblin. This version is actually a hero instead of a villain, mistaking Spider-Man for a villain during their first encounter. Instead of a glider, he wields a backpack that sprouts wings. The Goblin next appears when he finds out that both Spider-Man and Peter Parker are the same person. He also learns that Spider-Man is from the original Earth and his intentions on Counter-Earth are to rescue John Jameson. Since Jameson, who is working with the rebels against the High Evolutionary, does not agree to come and lets Spider-Man go off on his own, the Goblin decides to help by getting a ship the High Evolutionary has, which was originally Spider-Man's called Solaris II.
 Mr. Meugniot (voiced by Garry Chalk) – The editor of the Daily Byte. In one episode, Peter jokes by asking him if he can call him "J.J." Named after series producer Will Meugniot.
 Vulture (voiced by Scott McNeil) – He is the Counter-Earth version of the Vulture. Like the Counter Earth Green Goblin, this version of the Vulture is a hero instead of a villain and also like the Counter-Earth Goblin where he first mistook Spider-Man for a villain. It is explained the Vulture was a human who got Bestial powers, hanging out with Beastials and disrespecting humans while he was also playing with his human servant's son. When he caused his human friend trouble, he hated the High Evolutionary for what he did and rebelled against him.

Episodes 
The following list reflects the correct viewing order of the Spider-Man Unlimited episodes.

Release and streaming 
In Australia, the series aired on Network Ten's Cheez TV morning cartoon block in August 2001. It ran again on Cheez TV in June–July 2002.

As with the majority of the other Disney-acquired Marvel Comics animated series, Liberation Entertainment UK planned to release this on DVD in 2009. Due to Liberation's bankruptcy, the Marvel licenses were re-acquired by Clear Vision Ltd, who released it on DVD (in Region 2 PAL format) in a two-disk set containing all 13 episodes. It was released on the May 3, 2010. Marvel.com had uploaded all of the series - sponsored by Panasonic - to their website on late 2009, each week another episode was uploaded. All 13 episodes are available on Amazon.com.

In 2019, Disney released all 13 episodes on Disney+ for streaming.

Comics

Comic adaptation 

Alongside the animated series, Marvel Comics commissioned a comic to tie in with the series. It would be the second volume of Spider-Man Unlimited as a whole from the company, but the only one of the Unlimited volumes to be based on it.  The first two issues were adapted from the first three episodes of the series, with the last three providing their own storyline. In the final issue, Spider-Man meets an escapee from Haven, a Bestial version of Wolverine. After fighting, the two team up and take down a Bestial Chameleon. It is hinted that Wolverine is really Naoko Jones' missing husband (although the cartoon hints that the Goblin is really Naoko's husband). The question was never resolved as poor sales ended the comic's run.

The series was somewhat referred to in the "Webspinners: Tales of Spider-Man" issues 13 and 14 from February and March 2000 where the Peter Parker of Earth-616 is teleported into another dimension ruled by Blastaar while chasing Carnage (who himself was running away from the NYC police) and finds himself in the costume Spider-Man wore in this TV Show, he joins forces with Dusk and remains in this suit until he defeats both villains and transported back to his homeworld with the knocked out Carnage.

Mainstream continuity 
A copy of the series' universe, labeled Earth-7831, is massacred by Morlun's brother Daemos during the events of Spider-Verse. Another version of Spider-Man wearing this costume is seen alive and assisting other Spiders in the climax of Spider-Geddon.

In other media

Film 
The Peter Parker / Spider-Man from Spider-Man Unlimited will return in the forthcoming animated feature film Spider-Man: Across the Spider-Verse (2023), depicted as a member of Miguel O'Hara's Spider-Forces.

Video games 
The Unlimited suit appears as an unlockable costume for Spider-Man in Neversoft's Spider-Man vídeo game and in its 2001 sequel, Spider-Man 2: Enter Electro.

References

External links 

 Spider-Man Unlimited on the website of producer Will Meugniot
 
 
 International Catalogue of Superheroes
 Marvel Animation Age Presents: Spider-Man Unlimited
 A coverage and recommendation on MTV from 2013

 
1990s American animated television series
1999 American television series debuts
2000s American animated television series
2001 American television series endings
American children's animated action television series
American children's animated adventure television series
American children's animated science fiction television series
American children's animated superhero television series
Animated series produced by Marvel Studios
Television shows based on Marvel Comics
Animated television series based on Marvel Comics
Episode list using the default LineColor
Fox Kids
Fox Broadcasting Company original programming
Television series about parallel universes
Animated Spider-Man television series
Television series by Saban Entertainment
Television series set on fictional planets